Soheil Haghshenas (born 26 June 1982 in Rasht) is an Iranian footballer. He is currently as Assistant coach in Sepidrood Rasht. He played 14 years for Sepidrood  in his career.

Club career
He started his career with Sepidrood F.C. and played 3 seasons for the club and then joined Pegah Gilan, after Pegah was promoted to Pro League he left the club and joined Tarbiat Yazd but only trained with them for 2 months because he got accepted in the University of Guilan he decided to continue his school and joined Sepidrood once more.

Haghshenas was an important part of Sepidrood F.C. success during the 2009–2010 season and also won the 2nd division top goalscorer of the season after scoring 21 goals, He also became team's captain. In the next season he joined Azadegan League team Bargh Shiraz.

References
  Iran Pro League Stats
  Interview
 Pic

1982 births
Living people
Iranian footballers
Pegah Gilan players
Bargh Shiraz players
Sepidrood Rasht players
People from Rasht
Association football forwards
Sportspeople from Gilan province